Fimland is a Norwegian surname. Notable people with the surname include:

Håkon Fimland (1942–2016), Norwegian hurdler and politician
Kristian Mathias Fimland (1889–?), Norwegian politician

Norwegian-language surnames